XML or the Extensible Markup Language is a document formatting language.

XML may also refer to:

 Explainable machine learning (XML), a type of artificial intelligence
 Malaysian Sign Language ISO 639 language code xml
 Minlaton Airport IATA airport code XML, serving Minlaton, South Australia, see List of airports in Australia

See also
 
 XMI (disambiguation)
 XM1 (disambiguation)